Natalia Morari (born 12 January 1984 in Kotovsk, Moldavian SSR) is a Moldovan investigative journalist for the Russian magazine New Times. She was a permanent resident of Russia until she was expelled in December 2007, presumably for exposing corruption in Russia. Born in Moldova, she moved to Russia in 2002 to study sociology at the Moscow State University, which she graduated in 2007. Morari applied for Russian citizenship, which she was supposed to get in April 2008, but the citizenship was denied citing national security reasons.

She has a son named Rem, who was born on 12 April 2021.

Investigations

In May 2007, Morari broke open the story about a money laundering case involving Austria's Raiffeisen Zentralbank and several top Putin's administration officials, including FSB Deputy Head Alexander Bortnikov. According to her, top Russian Central Bank official Andrei Kozlov had been murdered for pursuing those leads and revoking the license from the implicated Diskont bank.

In mid-December 2007, Morari published an article "The black cash of the Kremlin" in which she described how a vast illegal political fund was used to keep all major political parties in Russia dependent on the central authorities during the 2007 Russian legislative election.

Expulsion from Russia

After her article on political funding, Natalia Morari was hindered to re-enter Russia by the orders of Federal Security Service of the Russian Federation. The International Federation of Journalists called on the European bodies to investigate the case. Russia's Union of Journalists also condemned the deportation. According to Wall Street Journal, she was deported for exposing secrets of the FSB: 
"Ms. Morari had written extensively about alleged corruption in Russia's security services, some of which she said had been leaking incriminating information about their rivals in a power struggle between the groups. This fall, she wrote about a corruption investigation into kickback and extortion allegations against some top officials of the FSB federal security service, the successor agency to the KGB."

A number of journalists has spoken out on account of Morari's case. As put by a popular journalist Oleg Kashin in magazine Russian Life: 
"Yet a year ago that wasn't the place, and today one can speak about the tendency — movements of unreliable people are not only traced — now law enforcement bodies allow themselves to mess with these movements, deciding without any court statements who can move somewhere, and who should be dealt with... Straight-arrows aren't to bother. At least, straight-arrows themselves are assured in that. They will be sure in that for long — till the very bell in the night when it'll be nobody to call for help. Of course, that sounds much of operetta-style, but the problem really exists and it must be managed."

In February 2008, she married in Moldova a Russian colleague in an attempt to get around the ban, but when she arrived in Moscow, she was not allowed to leave the airport, spending three days in the transit area before returning to Chişinău.

In March 2008, Morari announced that she decided to complain to the European Court of Human Rights that several human rights from the European Convention on Human Rights have been violated: that a family (she and her husband) cannot be separated and not being given water and food during the days she stayed at the Domodedovo airport and for not being notified of the reason why she was refused entry the second time.

The refusal of being granted citizenship was officially explained as being a consequence of a law which denies it to people who advocate "forceful change of the constitutional regime" or who create "a threat to the security of the state".

Protests in Moldova
On April 6 (part of the 2009 Moldova civil unrest), Morari and other activists organized a protest in front of the Parliament of Moldova, in relation to the Moldovan parliamentary election, 2009. They did this using social-networking tools such as Twitter. She expected no more than 300 people to show up at the flash mob, but as many as 10,000 came to the protest, including the leaders of the major opposition parties.

The following day, protests escalated into a civil unrest marred with violence. Morari said on her blog that she organized a peaceful protest and she was not responsible for the violence in the protests of the following days. During the protests she urged demonstrators to stop violence.

On April 9, Morari was officially charged by the Moldovan government with "calls for organizing and staging mass disturbances" and put under house arrest.

On November 11, 2009, all charges were officially dropped against Morari, who was accused by the previous government of using social networking websites to organize violent street protests in Chișinău in the spring. Chief prosecutor Valeriu Zubco dropped the charges against Morari and three others, including Gabriel Stati, the son of Moldova's richest businessman.

Cultural references
Morari is a subject of an ironic verse by Dmitrii Bykov "И это все устроила Морарь!" (And all of this was organized by Morari). The poetry deals with the rumours that Morari single-handedly  organized 2009 Moldova civil unrest and if she had been allowed into Russia she would have organized a revolution there. The verse is finished by the words:

Вы ждете утешительной морали?
Мораль проста, хотя и не длинна.
Страна, что может рухнуть от Морари,
действительно великая страна!

You are waiting for a comforting moral?
The moral is simple although not that long.
The country that can collapse because of Morari,
Is certainly a great country!

References

External links
Morari's blog
All of Morari articles in the New Times (Russian)
Exile: the price for defying Putin, The Independent, by Shaun Walker, January 19, 2007
Interview with Natalia Morari by Grigory Pasko

1984 births
Living people
Investigative journalists
Moldovan journalists
Moldovan women journalists
Moscow State University alumni
Moldovan expatriates in Russia
Moldovan activists